The Important Book is a 1949 children's picture book written by American author Margaret Wise Brown and illustrated by Leonard Weisgard. The book describes various common entities and describes some of their major attributes in brief poetic passages, beginning and ending with what Brown considers the key attribute:
The important thing about rain is
that it is wet.
It falls out of the sky,
and it sounds like rain,
and makes things shiny,
and it does not taste like anything,
and is the color of air.
But the important thing about rain is
that it is wet.

— Margaret Wise Brown, The Important Book

Reception
Mark Frauenfelder, calling the book Brown's magnum opus, described it as "true poetry about perceiving the world around us" that "rekindles the sense of wonder we were born with". The book has remained in print since its initial publication, and is frequently used in early writing education since the simple pattern is easy for young children to mimic; Crista Boske and Autumn Tooms further attributed the book's popularity in education to "the value of working with a book that overtly invites the reader to think for themselves in the midst of learning the concrete and abstract simultaneously"

The American National Education Association listed the book at #92 in its "Teachers' Top 100 Books for Children" list, compiled in 2007.

References

1949 children's books
1949 poetry books
American picture books
American poetry collections
Books by Margaret Wise Brown
Harper & Brothers books
Children's poetry books